Christina Tsafou (born 1957) is a Greek actress known for her TV and film roles.

Career
She trained to be an actor at Karolos Koun's Drama School. She became known for appearing in the series Θεσμοφοριάζουσες. Her work also includes The Dreamcatcher, You Will Find Your Teacher, The Life of the Other and The Classmates. From 2003 to 2006 she was in the Greek TV comedy drama To kafe tis Charas. In 2014 she appeared in the Greek telenovella Symmathites.

Her films include I love Karditsa and Larissa confidential.

She has a son, Christos Zachariades, who is also an actor.

Filmography

Television

Films include
 Afstiros Katallilo (2006)
 Thursday the 12th (2014)

References

Living people
21st-century Greek actresses
1957 births
Place of birth missing (living people)
Greek television actresses
Greek film actresses
Actresses from Athens